Patrik Jensen (born 24 November 1969) is a Swedish guitarist and co-founder of the bands, The Haunted (1996-present), and Witchery (1997-present), and also the former guitarist of the bands Orchriste (1987-1990), Seance (1990-1995) Satanic Slaughter (1994-1996) and Brujeria (1997).

Jensen was raised in Edmonton, until he was 10.

Jensen received his first guitar when he was seven years old, but started playing when he was sixteen years old - he took guitar lessons for five years thereafter. Jensen plays his signature E1.6 Jensen from Solar Guitars  and uses Engl amplification and EMG pick-ups (85/81).

In 2013, Jensen played some live shows with In Flames for Niclas Engelin, when Engelin was unable to play, due to becoming a father.

As of 2021 Jensen serves as a part time touring guitarist for The Halo Effect (band) replacing Jesper Stromblad when he is unable to play due to ongoing illness.

Discography

Orchriste
Necronomicon (1989)

Seance
Levitised Spirit (1991)
Fornever Laid to Rest (1992)
Saltrubbed Eyes (1993) - lyrics, album cover

Satanic Slaughter
Satanic Slaughter (1995)	
Land of the Unholy Souls (1996)

With The Haunted
Demo '97 (1997)
The Haunted (1998)
Made Me Do It (2000)
Live Rounds in Tokyo (2001)
Caught on Tape (2002)
One Kill Wonder (2003)
Revolver (2004)
The Dead Eye (2006)
Versus (2008)
Unseen (2011)
Eye of The Storm (2014)
Exit Wounds (2014)
Strength in Numbers (2017)

With Witchery
Restless & Dead (1998) 
Witchburner EP (1999)
Dead, Hot and Ready (1999) - mixing
Symphony for the Devil (2001) - lyrics
Don't Fear the Reaper (2006)
Witchkrieg (2010) - lyrics
In His Infernal Majesty's Service (2016)
I Am Legion (2017)
Nightside (2022)

References

The Haunted (Swedish band) members
Swedish heavy metal guitarists
Living people
People from Linköping
1969 births
Brujeria (band) members
Witchery members